Hovil (also, Govyl’ and Khovil’) is a village and municipality in the Lerik Rayon of Azerbaijan.  It has a population of 260.

References 

Populated places in Lerik District